Ben Kilpatrick (January 5, 1874 – March 12, 1912) was an American outlaw during the closing years of the American Old West.  He was a member of the Wild Bunch gang led by Butch Cassidy and Elzy Lay. He was arrested for robbery and served about 10 years of his 15-year sentence. Upon his release from prison, he returned to crime and was killed by a hostage during a train robbery.

Early life
Kilpatrick was born in Coleman County, Texas, in 1874, the third of nine children of a Tennessee-born farmer, George Washington Kilpatrick (or "Killpatrick"), by his wife, Mary, a native of South Carolina, according to the 1880 Federal Census.

He worked as a cowboy for a time in Texas and became acquaintances with Tom and Sam Ketchum and Bill Carver.

Outlaw life

After Cassidy's release from prison, Lay and he organized the Wild Bunch gang, and the gang began the most successful train-robbing career in history. Kilpatrick is thought to have been a friend of Lay, but he may have had minimal  or no involvement with crimes involving Butch Cassidy or the Sundance Kid. Kilpatrick became involved with Kid Curry, but where or how they met is uncertain.

Escape
The gang would commit their robberies, split up, and then head in several different directions, meeting some time later in the Hole in the Wall hideout in Wyoming.
Bullion and he made their way to Nashville, Tennessee, where they met with Kid Curry and his girlfriend Della Moore. Moore was arrested shortly thereafter for passing money traced back to one of the gang's robberies.

Arrest
Kilpatrick was captured on November 5, 1901, in St. Louis, Missouri, and received a 15-year sentence.

Death

He was released from prison in June 1911. On March 12, 1912, Kilpatrick and outlaw Ole Hobek were killed while robbing a train near Sanderson, Texas. The duo is thought to have participated in several train robberies outside of Memphis in November 1911 and February 1912, as well as other small robberies in West Texas.

In March 1912, Kilpatrick boarded a Southern Pacific Express train near Sanderson, Texas, alongside a former inmate whom he had befriended. Attempting a robbery, Kilpatrick held up the express messenger, David Trousdale, in the Wells Fargo baggage and mail car. While Kilpatrick looted the safe and any other valuables he could find, Trousdale managed to hide an ice mallet underneath the back of his jacket. Trousdale then told Kilpatrick that there was a valuable package lying on the ground. Kilpatrick rested his rifle against his leg while he leaned over to pick up the package. As he did, Trousdale pulled the mallet from beneath his coat and struck Kilpatrick three times in the back of the neck and head. Kilpatrick died instantly of a broken neck and crushed skull. The beating with the mallet was so brutal that Kilpatrick's brains stained the walls of the car.

See also

Baxter's Curve Train Robbery

References

Further reading

Soule, Arthur, The Tall Texan - The Story of Ben Kilpatrick, Deer Lodge, Montana: TrailDust Publishing Inc., 1995

External links
Ben Kilpatrick partial bio
Timeline
The story of Kilpatrick's last robbery

1874 births
1912 deaths
American bank robbers
Butch Cassidy's Wild Bunch
Concho County, Texas
Cowboys
Deaths by firearm in Texas
Fugitives
Gunslingers of the American Old West
Outlaws of the American Old West
People from Coleman County, Texas
People shot dead by law enforcement officers in the United States
Train robbers